"Serendipity" is Mai Kuraki's song from her eleventh studio album Smile, released on May 20, 2015. Kuraki re-recorded this song with Sensation, and it was released on January 7, 2016. The original version of the song is the only song Kuraki released in 2015.

Release
On May 20, 2015, the original version of "Serendipity" was released on major music download services, but it didn't reach any major charts.

On January 7, 2016, the song was re-released featuring Sensation and premiered on Recochoku.

Music video
The video was released on January 5, 2016, on GyaO and January 6 on YouTube. On GyaO, the video was watched more than 23,000 times in 4 days.

Track listing

Charts

Daily charts

Weekly charts

Release history

References

External links
Mai Kuraki Official Website

Japanese-language songs
Mai Kuraki songs
2015 songs
Songs written by Mai Kuraki
Songs with music by Akihito Tokunaga
Song recordings produced by Daiko Nagato